Viktor Viktorovich Solodov (born 15 June 1962) is a retired Russian weightlifter. Between 1983 and 1986 he won three gold and four silver medals at the world and European championships and set four ratified world records. He missed the 1984 Summer Olympics due to their boycott by the Soviet Union and the 1988 Summer Olympics due to an injury. 

Solodov retired in 1990 and later worked as a weightlifting administrator and international referee. He is married and has two sons and one daughter.

References

1962 births
People from Myski
Living people
Soviet male weightlifters
World Weightlifting Championships medalists
European Weightlifting Championships medalists